A Study in Terror is a 1965 British thriller film directed by James Hill and starring John Neville as Sherlock Holmes and Donald Houston as Dr. Watson. It was filmed at Shepperton Studios, London, with some location work at Osterley House in Middlesex.

Although based on Conan Doyle's characters, the story is an original one, which has the famous detective on the trail of Jack the Ripper. The story of A Study in Terror challenges Sherlock Holmes to solve these horrific crimes. This leads Holmes through a trail of aristocracy, blackmail and family insanity. Unlike Scotland Yard, and the real-life story, Holmes eventually discovers the true identity of the Ripper.

The film had its world premiere at the Leicester Square Theatre in the West End of London on 4 November 1965. A Study in Terror presents the first film appearance of Mycroft Holmes.

Plot
In the dark alleys of London, the notorious Jack the Ripper is committing a series of gruesome murders. Holmes and Watson, already intrigued by reports of the Jack the Ripper murders, become involved when they receive a parcel from Whitechapel containing a case of surgical instruments with the scalpel, possibly the murder weapon, missing. By a family crest on the box, they come into contact with the Duke of Shires who admits his elder son Michael Osborne dreamed of becoming a doctor. His younger son, Lord Carfax, tells them Michael has disappeared. Holmes deduces the instruments were pawned to a broker, Joseph Beck, who tells them that he received them from an Angela Osborne, who gave her address as a soup kitchen run by Doctor Murray.

Holmes and Watson meet Murray, also a police pathologist, after convincing Lestrade to let them view the body of the most recent victim, Annie Chapman. Holmes convinces Watson to go to the soup kitchen and make a fuss of looking for Angela. A disguised Holmes then follows Murray's niece Sally when she goes to meet Carfax. They explain Carfax was blackmailed by a man who threatened to tell his father that Michael, who was helping Murray at the soup kitchen, had married a prostitute. Carfax now works there himself but Michael was gone before he and Sally arrived. The blackmailer, Max Steiner, now runs a local public house.

The Prime Minister asks Mycroft Holmes to persuade his brother to investigate the Ripper case, unaware that he is already involved. Holmes and Watson nearly catch the Ripper when he kills another prostitute who invites him into her room. Holmes confronts Murray who explains that Michael had learned that Angela had assisted Steiner with the blackmail. During an altercation between the three of them, Angela was disfigured when acid was thrown in her face. Murray also reveals his crippled and mentally disabled assistant is Michael, the result of a brutal beating from Steiner. Holmes and Watson discover Angela in the upper room of Steiner's inn and she admits that she sent them the surgical instruments, having removed the scalpel herself, to get them involved. Holmes and Watson return Michael to his family.

During the night, Holmes discovers Carfax attempting to kill Angela in her room; he is the Ripper. The pub catches alight during a struggle; Carfax, Steiner and Angela are all killed in the blaze but Holmes escapes. He explains to Watson that Carfax had no way of identifying Angela so he killed every prostitute that he came across in the hope that one of them would be her. With all those involved dead, Holmes elects to keep the truth from the police.

Cast

Sir Nigel Films
The movie was from Sir Nigel Films, a company set up by the estate of Sir Arthur Conan Doyle, with the aim of exploiting Doyle's literary works in film and television. Henry Lester, managing director of Sir Nigel said "We felt that the royalties we were receiving from various media outlets bore little relation to profits. Also we were not pleased with the quality of some of the films." Doyle's son Arthur was chairman of the board on the company.

In 1963 the Mirisch Company obtained the rights to make The Life of Sherlock Holmes. However, when that project was delayed, the Mirischs gave permission for Sir Nigel to make A Study in Terror and one more film.

A Study in Terror was a co production between Sir Nigel Films and Britain's Compton Group, and American producer Herman Cohen. Sir Nigel were entitled to fifty percent of the profits.

In 1966 Sir Nigel had plans for five movies and a television series.

Production

Development
According to producer Herman Cohen, he had been thinking of making a movie about Sherlock Holmes, and so had the producing team of Michael Klinger and Tony Tenser. They decided to team up and Cohen arranged for finance through Columbia.

Cohen says the idea of combining Sherlock Holmes and Jack the Ripper came from Donald and Derek Ford, who wrote the first draft. Cohen was not happy with it and arranged for a rewrite from Harry Craig, who Arthur Conan Doyle and Henry Lester liked. Craig was not credited on the final film.

Cohen says Arthur Doyle had little involvement in the movie apart from visiting the set but Lester was involved in many discussions. Cohen says, "There were several things we wanted to do that he would say. "Oh, no. no. Sherlock Holmes wouldn't do that!”"

Shooting
The film was shot at Shepperton Studios. Cohen says he had to direct the fire sequence because director James Hill went missing. "Hill had a habit of disappearing," said the producer. "He was a nice guy, but strange.  Nobody could get close to him. And he was always fidgety and very nervous."

Release
Producer Herman Cohen originally wanted to title the film Fog but Columbia insisted on the title A Study in Terror to tie in with the Sherlock Holmes novel A Study in Scarlet.

Cohen also recalled on its US release Columbia advertised the film as a then-popular tongue in cheek Batman-type film rather than a horror or detective film.

Box office
Cohen said the film was a bigger hit in Europe than the US, which he attributed in part to the fact that he, not Columbia, handled the ad campaign.

Reception

Critical
The Monthly Film Bulletin gave a lackluster review saying "the film marks time lamely in the intervals between its conventionally shock-cut murders, while John Neville and Donald Houston uncomfortably mouth their lines as if suspecting that nobody will listen." Variety felt that "though the mixture of fiction and fact doesn't entirely click...An excellent cast gives the production fill value." The New York Times said "the entire cast, director and writers do play their roles well enough to make wholesale slaughter a pleasant diversion." Allmovie gave the film a very positive review, praising it as a "well-made and exciting mystery...satisfying and well-acted."

Post-release history
In 1966, the film was made into a novel by Ellery Queen and Paul W. Fairman. The novelisation is unusual in that it adds a framing story wherein Ellery Queen reads a manuscript that re-tells the actions of the film. The framing story was written by Ellery Queen and the novelisation of the film itself by Fairman.

The Holmes-Ripper idea was later taken up in Murder by Decree (1978), in which Frank Finlay reprised his role as Lestrade and Anthony Quayle once again had an important part (though this time as Sir Charles Warren of Scotland Yard).

The film inspired the writing of Sherlock Holmes's War of the Worlds (1975), blending the story of Sherlock Holmes and the world of H. G. Wells' science fiction novel The War of the Worlds.

Soundtrack
A Study in Terror (1965) was composed by John Scott in his first feature film score conducting the Hollywood Symphony Orchestra (HSO 333).

See also
Dust and Shadow: An Account of the Ripper Killings by Dr. John H. Watson
The Last Sherlock Holmes Story
Murder by Decree

Notes

References

External links

 
 
 
A Study in Terror at BFI

1965 films
1960s historical thriller films
British historical thriller films
1960s English-language films
Films set in London
Films set in 1888
Films about Jack the Ripper
Sherlock Holmes films
Sherlock Holmes pastiches
Films set in the Victorian era
Films directed by James Hill (British director)
Films scored by John Scott (composer)
British crossover films
Columbia Pictures films
Films shot at Shepperton Studios
1960s British films